The .38-72 Winchester, also known as .38-72 WCF is a rimmed, bottleneck centerfire rifle cartridge introduced in 1895 for the Winchester 1895 lever-action rifle.

Description and Performance
This straight-walled cartridge case was designed for black powder rather than smokeless powder. 

Besides the Winchester 1895 lever-action, the .38-72 WCF was chambered in the Winchester 1885 single-shot rifle.

With the introduction of superior cartridges designed for smokeless powder, the .38-72 WCF became obsolete and was soon dropped as an optional caliber for the Winchester Model 1895 and 1885  Production of loaded cartridges by Winchester ceased in 1936.

Dimensions

See also
 List of Winchester Center Fire cartridges
 List of cartridges by caliber
 List of rifle cartridges
 9 mm caliber
 9.3×74mmR
 .375 Winchester
 .38-55 Winchester

References

External links

 .38-72 WCF
 38-72 Winchester

Pistol and rifle cartridges
Winchester Repeating Arms Company cartridges
Weapons and ammunition introduced in 1895
Rimmed cartridges